The Jijhotia Brahman(also spelled Jijhautia) are Yajur Vedik Brahmin community, found in the Chambal and Yamuna river valleys in the north, and  Tamas river east & the Narmada valley in the south.

References

Brahmin communities of Uttar Pradesh
Brahmin communities of Madhya Pradesh